Joe McIntyre may refer to:

Joey McIntyre (born 1972), American singer and songwriter
Joe McIntyre (Coronation Street), a character from Coronation Street
Joe McIntyre (footballer) (born 1971), English soccer player